The 2018 Three Rivers District Council election took place on 3 May 2018 to elect members of Three Rivers District Council in England. This was the same day as other local elections.

Results Summary

Ward Results

An asterisk * indicates an incumbent seeking re-election.

Abbots Langley & Bedmond

Carpenders Park

Chorleywood North and Sarratt

Chorleywood South & Maple Cross

Dickinsons

Durrants

Gade Valley

Leavesden

Martin Brooks was elected as a Liberal Democrat in 2014 but stood in the incumbent in 2018 as an Independent.

Moor Park & Eastbury

Oxhey Hall & Hayling

Penn & Mill End

Rickmansworth Town

South Oxhey

References 

2018 English local elections
2018
2010s in Hertfordshire